
This is a list of unmade and/or unreleased animated projects by The Walt Disney Company. These include feature films, short films, and television series/specials, stemming from Walt Disney Animation Studios, Pixar, Disney Television Animation, and other animation studios owned by The Walt Disney Company. Some of these projects stem from simply Walt Disney Pictures.

1930s

1933

1934

1935

1936

1937

1938

1939

1940s

1940

1941

1942

Note: Disney studios produced an animated sequence for Samuel Goldwyn's film Up in Arms, which was unused in the final version of the film.

1943

1944

1945

1946

1947

Note: Fun and Fancy Free, released in 1947, was originally planned to be two separate feature films.

1948

1949

Note: The Adventures of Ichabod and Mr. Toad, released in 1949, was originally planned to be two separate feature films.

1950s

1951

1955

1959

1960s

1960

1963

1967

1969

1970s

1973

1976

1980s

1980

1981

1983

1985

1986

1988

1989

1990s

1990

1991

1992

1993

1994

1996

1998

2000s

2000

2001

2002

2003

2004

2005

2006

2007
In June 2007, DisneyToon Studios president Sharon Morrill stepped down, and the animation studio units under the Walt Disney Company underwent corporate restructuring as the Pixar leadership assumed more control. Thus, most sequels, plus a prequel series, out of DisneyToon Studios were cancelled.

2010s

2010

2011

2012

2013

2014

2017

2018

2020s

2021

See also
 List of unproduced 20th Century Studios animated projects
 List of unproduced Marvel Comics projects
 List of unproduced television projects based on Marvel Comics
 List of unproduced films based on Marvel Imprints

References

Bibliography
 

 
Unmade and unreleased Disney animated shorts and feature films, List of
Disney
Unreleased Disney